Wings was a military aviation history magazine published in the United States between 1971 and 2007. The magazine featured articles and photo features covering military aviation from World War I to the modern era, focusing heavily on American aircraft.

History and profile
Wings was first published in 1971 as a bi-monthly schedule, alternating monthly with its sister magazine, Airpower. Until the late 1990s it was published by Sentry Books, Inc., before being sold to  Republic Press. Republic ceased publication of Wings and Airpower in May 2007, when the circulation fell below what it considered an economically viable level.

Wings was headquartered in Granada Hills, California.

References

External links
 Electronic Wings back issues (online store)

Bimonthly magazines published in the United States
History magazines published in the United States
Aviation magazines
Defunct magazines published in the United States
Magazines established in 1971
Magazines disestablished in 2007
Magazines published in Los Angeles
Military magazines published in the United States